is a Japanese figure skater. He is the 2023 Four Continents bronze medalist, 2020 Bavarian Open champion, the 2019–20 Junior Grand Prix Final champion, and a two-time Japan Junior national silver medalist. He is the former junior world record holder for the men's free skating and combined total score.

Personal life 
Sato was born on February 6, 2004, in Sendai, Japan.

His favorite animals are pandas. Sato's figure skating idol is fellow Sendai native Yuzuru Hanyu, who gave him an amulet when Sato was five years old.

Career

Early career
Sato began skating in 2009. He is a four-time Japanese national novice champion and the 2018–19 Japanese national junior silver medalist. On the junior level, Sato is also the 2018 Bavarian Open silver medalist and the 2019 International Challenge Cup champion.

As the four-time Japanese national novice champion, Sato was invited to skate in the gala at the 2015 NHK Trophy, 2016 NHK Trophy and 2017 World Team Trophy. He was also invited to skate in the gala at the 2019 World Championships as the silver medalist in the 2018 Japanese junior nationals.

2019–2020 season: JGP Final champion
Sato won the gold medal in his Junior Grand Prix debut at 2019 JGP United States, ahead of reigning JGP Final champion Stephen Gogolev of Canada. He then won bronze at 2019 JGP Croatia. Sato's results qualified him to the 2019–20 Junior Grand Prix Final. At the JGP Final, he set new junior world records for the free skating and the combined score en route to winning the gold medal, ahead of Russians Andrei Mozalev and Daniil Samsonov. He remarked: "I was surprised that I could win here."

Sato won the silver medal at the 2019–20 Japan Junior Championships, behind Yuma Kagiyama and ahead of Lucas Tsuyoshi Honda. As a result, he was invited to compete in the senior division at the 2019–20 Japan Championships, alongside the rest of the top six finishers in the junior division. Sato placed fifth in the senior event and was named to the team for the 2020 World Junior Championships with Kagiyama and placed sixth there.

2020–2021 season: International senior debut
Competing domestically, Sato won the silver medal at the Kanto Regional championship and then the gold medal at the Eastern Sectional championship, thus qualifying for a berth at the national championship. Making his Grand Prix debut at the 2020 NHK Trophy, Sato placed fifth. He was fifth as well at the 2020–21 Japan Championships.

2021–2022 season: First Grand Prix medal
Sato started the season competing at 2021 Japan Open, where he placed second in the men's free program after landing four quadruple jumps for the first time and won the gold medal with his teammates. He was then assigned to participate in the 2021 Asian Open Trophy, which served as a test event for the 2022 Winter Olympics, where he won a silver medal with unofficial personal bests in the short program and total score.

At his first Grand Prix event, 2021 Skate America, Sato dislocated his left acromioclavicular joint on a fall during practice. He thought about withdrawing, but despite severe pain, he decided to compete with the help of painkillers and without changing his planned programs' layout. He placed fifth in the short program with a new personal best (80.52) and fourth in the free skate and overall. At this second event, the 2021 Internationaux de France, Sato was fourth in the short program and third in the free skate, taking the silver medal overall, his first on the Grand Prix. Reflecting on his performance, he said that he was "really happy to be on the podium for the first time, but I need to catch up to Yuma, so I will work hard."

At the 2021–22 Japan Championships, Sato finished in seventh place. He was assigned to compete at the 2022 World Junior Championships. He subsequently declined to compete in the World Junior Championships due to his left shoulder injury and was replaced by Lucas Tsuyoshi Honda.

2022–2023 season: Four Continents bronze
Given two Grand Prix assignments, Sato began the season at the 2022 MK John Wilson Trophy. He was narrowly fourth in the short program, finished third in the free skate, and took the bronze medal. Despite a fall on his quad Lutz attempt in the free skate, he said, "the mistakes I made didn't affect my performance, and I went through until the end. So I'm quite happy about it." At his second event, the 2022 Grand Prix of Espoo, Sato fell on his quad Lutz attempt, finishing third in that segment. Needing at least a second place to qualify for the Grand Prix Final, Sato rallied in the free skate, placing second in that segment and rising to second overall. Celebrating his successful qualification, he said it "always has been a dream of mine, but I couldn't go with the cancellations. I put a lot of effort into trying to make the Grand Prix Final."

Competing at the Final in Turin, Sato placed sixth of six skaters in the short program after falling on his opening quad Lutz attempt and performing only a quad-double jump combination. He rallied in the free skate, moving up to fourth overall. He was fourth as well at the 2022–23 Japan Championships, finishing 1.20 points back of bronze medalist Kazuki Tomono. He was named first alternate for the 2023 World Championships, and assigned to compete at both the 2023 Winter World University Games and the 2023 Four Continents Championships.

Sato was third in the short program at the University Games, but dropped to fifth after the free skate. He was sixth in the short program at the Four Continents Championships after jump errors. A clean free skate, but for an edge call on a triple flip jump, saw him place third in that segment and rise to third overall, taking the bronze medal. Sato noted his change of fortunes, commenting that "last year at this time I was undergoing surgery and right now a year later I won third place at Four Continents." He said that the short program errors that had been plaguing him all season were an area of focus going forward. He then won gold at the International Challenge Cup.

World records and achievements

Junior world record scores
Sato is the former junior world record holder for the free skating and total score.
 FS – Free skating

Programs

Competitive highlights
GP: Grand Prix; CS: Challenger Series, JGP: Junior Grand Prix

2017–18 season to present

Earlier seasons

Detailed results
Current personal best scores are highlighted in bold.

Senior level

Junior level

References

External links
 
 Shun Sato | IMG (Japanese)
 

! colspan="3" style="border-top: 5px solid #78FF78;" |World Junior Record Holders

2004 births
Living people
Japanese male single skaters
Sportspeople from Sendai
21st-century Japanese people
Competitors at the 2023 Winter World University Games
Four Continents Figure Skating Championships medalists